Edna H. Scheer (November 4, 1926 – April 25, 2000) was a pitcher who played in the All-American Girls Professional Baseball League. She was born in Cedarburg, Wisconsin.

Edna Scheer played briefly for the Rockford Peaches during the 1950 season.

״Bunny״, as her teammates called her, collected a 3–1 record in 71 innings of work as a reliever and spot starter, helping her team win the pennant and championship title. A highly disciplined hitter as well, she posted a slash line (BA/OBP/SLG) of .286/.375/.321.

After her baseball days, Scheer became an owner/partner in restaurant business.

Since 1988 she is part of Women in Baseball, a permanent display based at the Baseball Hall of Fame and Museum in Cooperstown, New York, which was unveiled to honor the entire All-American Girls Professional Baseball League.

Scheer died in her hometown of Cedarburg at the age of 73. She is buried at Zur Ruhe Cemetery in Ozaukee County, Wisconsin.

Career statistics
Pitching

Batting 

Fielding

Sources

All-American Girls Professional Baseball League players
Baseball players from Wisconsin
People from Cedarburg, Wisconsin
1926 births
2000 deaths
Sportspeople from the Milwaukee metropolitan area
20th-century American women
20th-century American people